Foliose lichen is one of the morphological classes of lichens, which are complex organisms that arise from the symbiotic relationship between fungi and a photosynthetic partner, typically algae. This partnership allows lichen to live in diverse climates that can range from cold, dry mountains to wet, warm valleys. Lichens develop quite slowly with recorded growth rates of 0.01–27mm/year depending on the species. Their lifespan averages between 30 and 60 years.

Lichens have a main body part called the thallus, which is composed of hyphae, and houses the cortex and medulla. The cortex contains the photosynthetic cells while the medulla allows for gas exchange and makes up the bulk of the lichen's thallus. There are three main types of lichens: crustose, foliose, and fruticose. Foliose lichen are characterised by flattened leafy thalli, and an upper and lower cortex. Many have numerous layers, which are stratified, and aid in identifying different types.

Foliose lichens attach to surfaces by hyphae in the lower cortex with smaller root like structures called rhizines. Lichens play an important role environmentally. They provide a food source for many animals such as deer, goats, and caribou, and are used as building material for bird nests. Some species can even be used in antibiotics. They are also a useful indicator of atmospheric pollution level.

Pollution
There is a direct correlation between pollution and the abundance and distribution of lichen. Foliose lichens are extremely sensitive to sulphur dioxide, which is a by-product of atmospheric pollution. Sulphur dioxide reacts with the chlorophyll in lichen, which produces phaeophytin and magnesium ions. When this reaction occurs in plants the lichen will then have less chlorophyll causing a decrease in respiration which eventually kills the lichen.

Weathering of rocks
Minerals in rocks can be weathered by the growth of lichens on exposed rock surfaces. This can be attributed to both physical and chemical processes. Lichen can chemically weather minerals such as calcite by producing organic acids like oxalic acid. This reacts with minerals in the rock, dissolving them and weakening the rock. As a result of this many rocks that have or once had lichen growth exhibit extensive
surface corrosion. By-products of this weathering are poorly ordered iron oxides and amorphous alumino-silica gels, the neoformation of crystalline metal oxalates and secondary clay minerals. Lichen physically weather rocks by penetrating the rock's small crevasses with their rhizoids. The expansion and contraction of the roots causes smaller cracks to expand.

These combined processes – of chemical and physical weathering – also serve to deteriorate asphalt shingles, with foliose lichen byproducts dissolving the limestone (calcium carbonate) used as filler and their rhizoids expanding cracks which develop in the shingles over time.

Reproduction

The reproduction of foliose lichen can occur either asexually or sexually. The sexual reproduction requires both a fungal and photosynthetic partner. The photobiont once in symbionce with its fungal partner will not produce recognisable reproductive structures therefore it is up to the fungal partner to continue reproduction for the lichen. In order for lichen reproduction to take place the fungal partner must produce millions of germinating spores which fuse to form a zygote that must then also find a compatible photobiont. This photobiont will fuse with the zygote and live within the fungi creating a lichen. The fungal partner in most foliose lichen are ascomytes with spores called ascomata. The fruiting bodies of lichen typically make up one of two shapes. Apothecia which look like disk or cup shaped and produce their spores on their upper surface. And perithecia which are shaped like flasks that enclose a spore producing layer with a hole at the top ( Brodo, Sharnoff, and Sharnoff). Since sexual reproduction is inefficient, lichen will reproduce asexually by vegetative reproduction when possible. Foliose lichen use isidia which are cylindrical finger like protuberances from the upper cortex in which algal and fungal tissue is incorporated into. They are easily broken off and transported by wind where they will relocate and propagate forming a new lichen.

References

Lichenology